Kopé Tiatie Cac (also Koh and Koope; in Ndut language, meaning god grandfather or god the grandfather) is the Supreme Creator in the Serer religion. Kopé Tiatie Cac is the name used by the Ndut people to refer to the Supreme being. Among the Ndut and followers of Serer religion, Kopé Tiatie Cac is associated with death and plague (pisti).

Ndut cosmogony

The Ndut people who adhere to the tenets of Serer religion refer to the supreme god as Kopé Tiatie Cac in Cangin-Ndut. The name Kopé Tiatie Cac probably derived from the god Koox (var : Kooh). Ndut cosmogony posits that, the first humans did not die. The human species were not meant to die following the initial creation. The dog was the first to die at that primordial time. Having witnessed the death of the animal, the Ndut people gave the animal a sacred burial at the foot of a baobab tree, and mourned its death. The women crying and wailing in sadness for the departed dog, attracted the attention of Kopé Tiatie Cac (or Koh) God of death. The god angered by the mourning women unleashed death to human kind in the following terms:

Worship

The deity is worshiped through Serer ancestral spirits and saints. Various matrilineages (both on the paternal and maternal line) play a key role in its invocation. The name koh a variant of the god's' name, is the feminine form. The masculine form is ala.

See also

The people
Serer people
Saafi people
Palor people
Ndut people
Laalaa people
Serer-Noon
Niominka people
Languages
Cangin languages
Saafi language
Palor language
Ndut language
Lehar language
Noon language
Serer language

Serer religious articles
Serer religion
Roog (Serer deity)
Koox
Serer creation myth
Lamane
States headed by ancient Serer Lamanes
Saltigue
Ndut initiation rite
Timeline of Serer history

Related articles
Faro (mythology)
Nommo
Traditional African religion
List of African deities

References

Bibliography
Dupire, Marguerite, "Sagesse sereer: Essais sur la pensée sereer ndut", KARTHALA Editions, (1994), pp 61–86,  
Ndiaye, Ousmane Sémou, "Diversité et unicité sérères : l’exemple de la région de Thiès", Éthiopiques, no. 54, vol. 7, 2e semestre 1991 
Éthiopiques, "Issues 55-56", Fondation Léopold Sédar Senghor, (1991), p 124
Echenberg, Myron J., "Black death, white medicine: bubonic plague and the politics of public health in colonial Senegal, 1914-1945", Heinemann (2002), pp 139, 160-161, 
Dupire, Marguerite, "Totems sereer et contrôle rituel de l'environnement", p 39

Further reading
Faye, Louis Diène, "Mort et Naissance le monde Sereer", Les Nouvelles Editions Africaines (1983),  
Dione, Salif, "L'APPEL du Ndut. ou l'initiation des garcons Seereer", Institut Fondamental d'Afrique Noire, Cheikh Anta Diop (2004)

Serer gods
Plague gods
Death gods